Gols may refer to:
 Inositol 3-alpha-galactosyltransferase, an enzyme
 Gols (town)